The following United States highways are numbered 701:

United States
  U.S. Route 701
  Georgia State Route 701 (former)
  Ohio State Route 701
  Puerto Rico Highway 701